Czekanów may refer to the following places:
Czekanów, Greater Poland Voivodeship (west-central Poland)
Czekanów, Masovian Voivodeship (east-central Poland)
Czekanów, Silesian Voivodeship (south Poland)

See also 

 Czekanowo (disambiguation)